Gara Oreshets is a village located in Dimovo Municipality, in the Vidin Province, of northwestern Bulgaria.

References

Villages in Vidin Province